The Great Jasper is a 1933 American pre-Code drama film directed by J. Walter Ruben and written by H.W. Hanemann and Samuel Ornitz. The film stars Richard Dix, Edna May Oliver, Florence Eldridge, Wera Engels and Walter Walker. The film was released on February 17, 1933, by RKO Pictures.

Plot
The Great Jasper is a romantic drama which opens in the early days of the 20th century when Jasper Horn is introduced as a lively Irish driver of a New York City horse-drawn street car. Although Jasper is married and has a baby son, he has an affair with his bosses wife. Ten years later the boss discovers the true father of the boy he thought was his son, and fires Jasper. Jasper leaves his wife and child and becomes a boardwalk fortune-teller in Atlantic City, who begins to call himself The Great Jasper. Another 15 years pass and we discover that one of Jasper's sons has unfortunately become similar in behavior to Jasper.

Cast
Richard Dix as Jasper Horn
Edna May Oliver as	Madame Talma
Florence Eldridge as Jenny Horn
Wera Engels as Norma McGowd
Walter Walker as Daniel McGowd
David Durand as Andrew Horn
Bruce Cabot as Roger McGowd 
Betty Furness as Sylvia Bradfield 
James Bush as Andrew Horn

References

External links 
 

1933 films
American black-and-white films
1930s English-language films
RKO Pictures films
Films directed by J. Walter Ruben
1933 drama films
American drama films
1930s American films